Gallinas National Forest was established as the Gallinas Forest Reserve by the U.S. Forest Service on November 5, 1906 to protect  of land in the Gallinas Mountains NW of Corona, New Mexico. The area became a National Forest on March 4, 1907. On July 2, 1908 the area was transferred to Lincoln National Forest, a forest area SE of Corona.  In 1958 the Gallinas forest area was transferred to the Cibola National Forest, where it became a part of the Mountainair Ranger District, headquartered in Mountainair, New Mexico.

References

External links
Forest History Society

Former National Forests of New Mexico
Protected areas of Lincoln County, New Mexico
Protected areas of Torrance County, New Mexico
Cibola National Forest